Bernard Sunley & Sons was a British property development company.

It was founded in 1940 as Bernard Sunley & Son by Bernard Sunley (1910–1964) who "ranked alongside the most successful property developers of the 1950s property boom".

The company was dissolved in 2011.

Notable buildings
 Merton Civic Centre (1960)
 Arlington House, Margate (1964)
 City Tower, Manchester (1965)

References

Construction and civil engineering companies of the United Kingdom
British companies established in 1940
Construction and civil engineering companies established in 1940
Construction and civil engineering companies disestablished in 2011
Real estate companies established in 1940
Real estate companies disestablished in 2011
1940 establishments in England
2011 disestablishments in England
Sunley family
British companies disestablished in 2011